Petrophile scabriuscula is a species of flowering plant in the family Proteaceae and is endemic to southwestern Western Australia. It is a dense, prickly shrub with sharply-pointed, needle-shaped leaves more or less pressed against the branchlets, and oval heads of hairy, yellow to creamy-yellow flowers.

Description

Taxonomy
Petrophile scabriuscula was first formally described in 1845 by Carl Meissner in Johann Georg Christian Lehmann's book Plantae Preissianae from material collected by James Drummond near the Swan River. The specific epithet (scabriuscula) means "minutely scabrous".

Distribution and habitat
This petrophile grows in sandy woodland from Kalbarri National Park to near Moora in the Avon Wheatbelt, Geraldton Sandplains and Swan Coastal Plain biogeographic regions.

Conservation status
Petrophile scabriuscula is classified as "not threatened" by the Government of Western Australia Department of Parks and Wildlife.

References

scabriuscula
Eudicots of Western Australia
Endemic flora of Western Australia
Plants described in 1845
Taxa named by Carl Meissner